The 2017–18 season was Partick Thistle's fifth consecutive season in the top flight of Scottish football and the fifth in the newly established Scottish Premiership, having been promoted from the Scottish First Division at the end of the 2012–13 season.

Season Summary

Thistle competed in the 2017–18 Scottish League Cup where they finished second in Group H behind Livingston by 1 point and qualified for the Second Round. In the second round they surpassed St Johnstone and in the Quarter Finals took Rangers to extra time after Kris Doolan scored an injury time equaliser to make it 1-1, however lost 3-1 after extra time. Partick Thistle also competed in the Scottish Cup, where they lost in an away tie to Celtic in the fifth round. They ended the season being relegated from the Premiership via the play-offs, dropping to the Scottish Championship.

Competitions

Scottish Premiership

Premiership Play-off Final

Scottish League Cup

Group stage

Knockout round

Scottish Challenge Cup

Scottish Cup

Squad statistics

Appearances

|-
|colspan="14"|Players who left the club during the season:
|-

|}
Scottish Premiership matches includes play-off games against Livingston.

Goal Scorers

Disciplinary Record

Team statistics

League table

League Cup Table

Transfers

In

Out

Loans in

Loans out

See also
 List of Partick Thistle F.C. seasons

Notes

References

Partick Thistle F.C. seasons
Partick Thistle